This is a list of Danish television related events from 1980.

Events
29 March - Bamses Venner are selected to represent Denmark at the 1980 Eurovision Song Contest with their song "Tænker altid på dig". They are selected to be the thirteenth Danish Eurovision entry during Dansk Melodi Grand Prix held at the Falkoner Theatre in Copenhagen.

Debuts

Television shows

Ending this year

Births
5 June - Lisbeth Østergaard, TV & radio host
16 June - Sara Maria Franch-Mærkedahl, weathergirl

Deaths

See also
1980 in Denmark